Andrew John Bell (born 22 January 1982) is an English former cricketer. He was a right-handed batsman who played for Dorset. He was born in High Wycombe, Buckinghamshire.

Bell made a single List A appearance for the side, against Scotland in September 2001. He scored 22 not out, but was unable to save Dorset from a ten-wicket defeat.

External links 
Andrew Bell at Cricket Archive 

1982 births
Living people
English cricketers
Dorset cricketers
Sportspeople from High Wycombe